Detmolder Sommertheater  is a theatre in Detmold, North Rhine-Westphalia, Germany. It opened on 26 July 1896.

Theatres in North Rhine-Westphalia
Sommertheater
Theatres completed in 1896
1896 establishments in Germany